The Black Company, released in May 1984, is the first novel in Glen Cook's ongoing series The Black Company.  The book combines elements of epic fantasy and dark fantasy as it describes the dealings of an elite mercenary unit – the Black Company – with the Lady, ruler of the Northern Empire.


Plot introduction
The Dominator is an extremely powerful wizard who has the ability to turn his most bitter enemies into his loyal servants, even those nearly his equal in magic. The most potent of his victims are called the Ten Who Were Taken, or just Taken for short. With his wife, the Lady, whose magical skill is second only to that of the Dominator, he founded an empire unrivaled for evil. It was overthrown by a rebellion led by the White Rose, but neither she nor the rebel wizards were strong enough to kill the Dominator, the Lady or the Taken. The best they could do was to render them unconscious and imprison them. Their prison was a place called the Barrowland.

After four centuries, the wizard Bomanz awakened the Lady during a spirit walk into the Barrowlands, in an attempt to learn from her.  She manipulated him, won her freedom, and subsequently trapped Bomanz in a quasi-undead spirit state between dimensions.  She then unleashed the Taken, but betrayed the Dominator, leaving him where he was, and proceeded to resurrect the empire.  As with the old, so it was with the new – a rebellion broke out, spearheaded this time by the Circle of Eighteen. The Circle is made up of magicians not individually as strong as the Taken, but usually united in their goals. The Taken, on the other hand, battle each other as much as they do the rebels.

Plot summary
The Black Company's current employer, the Syndic of Beryl, is losing control of his decadent city to rival factions. A dangerous monster known as a forvalaka runs amok through the city, killing numerous citizens and contributing to the city's growing instability; the Syndic requests that the Black Company track and kill the beast. Because the creature is virtually indestructible, it kills several of the Black Company's men, including Tom-Tom, one of the Company's wizards. When the Taken named Soulcatcher offers the Company new employment in the service of the Lady, its Captain readily accepts, though he is forced to accept the killing of the Syndic to break the contract.

On the march north to the Lady's empire, the Company acquires two new members. Raven is an uncommonly deadly and (usually) remorseless recruit, even by Company standards. Uncharacteristically, he rescues Darling, a nine-year-old mute girl being abused by soldiers affiliated with the Limper, another of the Taken.  The Limper and Soulcatcher are deadly rivals; since the Company was recruited by Soulcatcher, that makes the Limper an enemy to beware.

After weeks of trying to link up with the Limper's forces, the Company (at Soulcatcher's suggestion) takes an important rebel fortress, embarrassing both the Limper and Raker, a leading member of the Circle of Eighteen.  The Limper sends his top aide, Colonel Zouad, to stir up trouble for the Company, but Elmo, the Company's Sergeant, leaks his whereabouts to the rebels, allowing them to abduct him for information.  Zouad manages to contact the Limper, but Soulcatcher has other plans. When the Limper cracks open the underground room where his minion is being held, Soulcatcher's Taken ally, Shapeshifter, is waiting disguised as a rebel and unexpectedly stuns him with magic. Shifter then rolls the incapacitated Limper into the cellar and causes it to collapse in on itself. Another victory for the Company, another humiliation for the Limper.  While the Limper is not killed, this slows him down for a time.

While the Limper is absent from his post, Raker's troops attack and part of the front collapses.  The Company is caught up in the general retreat but shows itself to be the Lady's most effective unit in the ensuing battles. The Captain is given authority normally reserved for the Taken.

Raker is targeted next. The Company's wizards, with Soulcatcher's backing, display a fortune in gold, silver and jewels (protected by magic) in a nearby, neutral city – a bounty for his head.  Raker has no choice but to try to steal it before half the world tries to collect.  Isolated when he ignores the Circle's order to withdraw, he is eventually killed by Raven and Croaker, but not before his disobedience saps the morale of the rebels in the region.

Retreating once more, the Company stumbles upon and captures a rebel training camp. Papers are found that belong to Whisper, the strongest member of the Circle and a military genius as well.  One details a future meeting with the Limper, who is ready to defect as a result of his string of disasters. Soulcatcher, Raven and Croaker ambush them. All the while Croaker has a nagging suspicion that someone is watching them who he later learns was Silent which was who he thought it was the whole time. They are captured alive and presented to the Lady, the Limper to face her wrath and Whisper to take her place among the Taken.  Limper is sentenced to centuries of torture by the Lady.

After the Lady uses magic she learned from the Dominator to gain Whisper's unswerving loyalty, the new Taken is sent to the eastern front. The war becomes a race: the rebel armies in the north, under the overall command of Circle wizard Harden, drive the Imperial forces back towards the Tower at Charm, the headquarters of the Lady, while Whisper runs amok in the east, laying waste to the heartland of the rebellion.

Harden is killed, but takes the Taken The Hanged Man with him. The Circle suffers more casualties, but massive rebel forces besiege the Tower. A daring sortie by the Company captures the wizards Feather and Journey, weakening the Circle further; they are transported to the Tower to share Whisper's fate.

The battle for the Tower begins. The Circle's forces number a quarter of a million while the Lady can muster a mere twenty-one thousand.  Yet so dangerous are the Lady and the Taken that the Circle delays, hoping to find the prophesied reincarnation of the White Rose to lead them.  A great comet hangs in the sky for most of the battle.  This is a symbol of the prophecy which says: the Lady and the Dominator will be defeated under a comet's fiery tail.  Finally, it is forced to attack without her before the empire's victorious eastern armies can arrive.  All of the Taken gather to bolster the defenses, killing the remaining members of the Circle, when they're not busy assassinating each other. Except for Soulcatcher, all of the original Taken are slain, some by the rebels, but more from internal backstabbing. During the fighting, Croaker observes that Darling seems to be immune to magic. Finally, the rebels are utterly devastated.

Then, with her plot to take over the empire discovered, Soulcatcher flees, but the Lady, with Croaker along as a witness, tracks her down. The physician shoots her with magical arrows supplied by the Lady and then beheads her. Croaker then learns that Soulcatcher is the Lady's own sister. Afterwards, he speculates that this was what the Lady had intended all along: not only to crush the revolt, but also to rid herself of all the treacherous Taken.

During the confusion, Raven deserts because he knows something he does not want the Lady to learn, taking Darling with him.  Raven, Croaker and Silent all seem to believe that Darling is the reincarnated White Rose, who will oppose the Lady and defeat the Empire.

Characters in The Black Company

The Black Company
Croaker – the Company's doctor and historian. The story is told from his viewpoint. He becomes infatuated with the Lady's persona, attracting her interest.
The Captain – leader of the Black Company
The Lieutenant – his second in command
Silent, Goblin, Tom-Tom and his brother One-Eye – moderately talented wizards, but no match for the Taken. Tom-Tom is killed at the beginning of the novel.
Elmo – the Sergeant
Otto and Hagop – longtime members of the Black Company
Raven – a new recruit with a grudge against the Limper
Darling – a young girl rescued by Raven

The Empire
The Lady – reputed (by Soulcatcher) to be so cold-hearted, she killed her own twin sister.  Wife of the Dominator.  Learned the ritual of Taking and therefore can take and empower her own wizards.
The Ten Who Were Taken
Soulcatcher, female – the Lady's sister. She and the Limper are implacable enemies. In an extreme case of sibling rivalry, she also schemes to overthrow the Lady.
Shapeshifter, male – the first of the Ten to be Taken.  As the name implies, he can assume the appearance of other people (and animals), the better to bring about their downfall.  He is Soulcatcher's closest ally among the Taken and hates the Limper even more than she does. He is shown to be fond of infiltrating enemy lines and weakening them from within.
The Limper, male – feverishly homicidal and totally lacking in finesse
The Howler, male – a small, dirty bundle of rags who howls at random intervals
Stormbringer, female – able to conjure storms and cause geological events
Bonegnasher, male – eight feet tall, extremely strong and grotesquely muscled
The Hanged Man, male – also called Crooked Neck because his neck is stuck in a crooked manner and swollen
Moonbiter, unknown gender
Nightcrawler, unknown gender
The Faceless Man, male

The Rebels 
 The Circle of Eighteen (some are not mentioned by name)
 Raker, male – the rebel equivalent of the Limper, sharing many of his less desirable qualities.
 Whisper, female – a military genius, as well as the strongest wizard in the Circle. Later taken by the Lady to replace the Limper after his treachery.
 Harden, male
 Feather, female
 Journey, male
 Moth
 Sidle
 Linger
 Trinket
 Parcel
 Whiskers
 Roper
 Tamarask

External links
 Black Company Maps
 Black Company Volume 1 Text At Google Books
 
 

Fiction about comets
Novels by Glen Cook
1984 American novels
American fantasy novels
Dark fantasy novels
Tor Books books